Flirting with Fate is a 1916 American film directed by Christy Cabanne and starring Douglas Fairbanks. It was produced by the Fine Arts Film Company and distributed by Triangle Film Corporation.

Synopsis
In a desperate, but not-too-courageous, attempt to end his life, a man hires a murderer to do the job for him.  Soon, though, things are looking better and he must now avoid the hit.

Cast 
Douglas Fairbanks as Augy Holliday
W.E. Lawrence as Harry, Augy's Friend
Jewel Carmen as Gladys, the Girl
Dorothy Haydel as Phyllis, Her Chum
George Beranger as Automatic Joe
J.P. McCarty as The Detective

See also
 Tribulations of a Chinaman in China (novel by Jules Verne, 1879)
 The Man in Search of His Murderer (1931)
 The Whistler (1944)
 You Only Live Once (1952)
 Five Days (1954)
 Up to His Ears (1965)
 Tulips (1981)
 I Hired a Contract Killer (1990)
 Bulworth (1998)
 Shut Up and Shoot Me (2005)

References

External links 

1916 films
1910s adventure comedy films
American black-and-white films
Films directed by Christy Cabanne
American silent feature films
American adventure comedy films
1916 comedy films
1910s American films
Silent American comedy films
Silent adventure films